= List of LCD matrices =

This is an incomplete list of LCD matrices.

- TN+Film Matrices
- IPS Matrices
- S-IPS Matrices
- E-IPS — Enhanced IPS (LG-specific terminology)
- H-IPS – Horizontal IPS (LG-specific terminology)
- P-IPS – Professional IPS (LG-specific terminology)
- DD-IPS Matrices
- ACE Matrices
- MVA Matrices
- PVA Matrices

== Bibliography ==
- X-bit labs LCD Guide
- TFT Central Panel Technologies Guide
